The 2023 NCAA Division II women's basketball tournament will be a single-elimination tournament to determine the national champion of women's NCAA Division II college basketball in the United States. The tournament will feature sixty-four teams.

The championship game will be held on April 1, 2023 at the American Airlines Center in Dallas, concurrent with the 2023 NCAA Division I women's basketball tournament Final Four, while the national quarterfinals and semifinals will be played at the St. Joseph Civic Arena in St. Joseph, Missouri.

Tournament schedule and venues

Regionals
First, second, and third-round games (the latter of which doubles as a regional championship) were held at campus sites from March 10–13, 2023. The top-seeded team in each regional served as host.

Elite Eight
The national quarterfinals quarterfinals, semifinals, and finals are being held at predetermined sites: the former two rounds will be played at the St. Joseph Civic Arena in St. Joseph, Missouri and the latter will be at American Airlines Center in Dallas.

The national championship will be played on April 1, 2023, in Dallas, which is also the host of the 2023 NCAA Division I women's basketball tournament Final Four.

Qualification
A total of 64 bids were available for the tournament: 23 automatic bids (awarded to the champions of each Division II conference) and 41 at-large bids.

The bids are allocated evenly among the eight NCAA-designated regions (Atlantic, Central, East, Midwest, South, South Central, Southeast, and West), each of which contains either two or three of the twenty-three Division II conferences that sponsor men's basketball. Each region consists of two or three automatic qualifiers (the teams who won their respective conference tournaments) and either five or six at-large bids, awarded regardless of conference affiliation.

Automatic bids (23)

At-large bids (41)

Bracket

Atlantic
 Site: Glenville, West Virginia (Glenville State)

* – Denotes overtime period

Central
 Site: Duluth, Minnesota (Minnesota-Duluth)

* – Denotes overtime period

East
 Site: Worcester, Massachusetts (Assumption)

* – Denotes overtime period

Midwest
 Site: Ashland, Ohio (Ashland)

* – Denotes overtime period

South
 Site: Tampa, Florida (Tampa)

* – Denotes overtime period

South Central
 Site: San Angelo, Texas (Angelo State)

* – Denotes overtime period

Southeast
 Site: Salisbury, North Carolina (Catawba)

* – Denotes overtime period

West
 Site: Carson, California (Cal State Dominguez Hills)

* – Denotes overtime period

Elite Eight
Site: Elite 8 and Final 4-St. Joseph Civic Arena, St. Joseph, Missouri/National Championship Game-American Airlines Center, Dallas, Texas

See also 
 2023 NCAA Division I women's basketball tournament
 2023 NCAA Division III women's basketball tournament
 2023 NAIA women's basketball tournament
 2023 NCAA Division II men's basketball tournament

References 

NCAA Division II women's basketball tournament
NCAA Division II women's
NCAA Division II women's
Basketball in Dallas